The 1974 Victorian Football Association season was the 93rd season of the top division of the Australian rules football competition, and the 14th season of second division competition. The Division 1 premiership was won by the Port Melbourne Football Club, after it defeated Oakleigh in the Grand Final on 22 September by 69 points; it was Port Melbourne's tenth Division 1 premiership, drawing it level with Williamstown for the most Division 1 premierships in VFA history, and the first of six premierships won in nine seasons between 1974 and 1982. The Division 2 premiership was won by Coburg in its first season after being relegated from Division 1; it was Coburg's second Division 2 premiership.

Division 1
The Division 1 home-and-away season was played over 18 rounds; the top four then contested the finals under the Page–McIntyre system. The finals were played at the St Kilda Cricket Ground.

Ladder

Finals

Awards
The leading goalkicker for the season was Jim Miller (Dandenong), who kicked 74 goals in the home-and-away season and 79 goals overall.
The J. J. Liston Trophy was won by Ray Goold (Sunshine), who polled 33 votes. Goold finished ahead of Les Stillman (Williamstown), who finished second with 32 votes, and Graeme Allan (Sunshine), who finished third with 28 votes.
Port Melbourne won the seconds premiership for the third consecutive season. Port Melbourne 14.8 (92) defeated Preston 11.14 (80) in the Grand Final, played as a stand-alone match on Saturday 14 September.
Preston won the lightning premiership. Preston 6.2 (38) defeated Prahran 5.3 (33) in the Grand Final, played as a curtain-raiser to the senior Grand Final on Sunday 22 September.

Division 2
The Division 2 home-and-away season was played over eighteen rounds; the top four then contested the finals under the Page–McIntyre system; all finals were played on Sundays at Toorak Park.

Ladder

Finals

Awards
The leading goalkicker for Division 2 was Peter Smith (Coburg) who kicked 101 goals in the home-and-away season, and 121 goals overall.
The J. Field Medal was won by Ron Allen (Waverley), who polled 45 votes. Allen finished ahead of Jim Johnstone (Mordialloc), who polled 30 votes, and Mick Martin (Yarraville), who polled 30 votes and finished third on countback.
Coburg won the seconds premiership. Coburg 24.13 (157) defeated Camberwell 14.18 (102) in the Grand Final at Northcote Park on Saturday, 7 September.

Notable events
On 14 April, Box Hill defeated Mordialloc by 13 points, ending a 25-game losing streak which dated back to 1972.
On 4 August, 64-year-old Sandringham trainer Ray Patmore abused and then struck field umpire Graeme Huggins during a match. He was fined $50 for the abusive language, and suspended for ten years for the striking charge.
In the final round of the home-and-away season, Caulfield and Sunshine played off in a match which directly determined which club was relegated. Caulfield 20.21 (141) defeated Sunshine 13.10 (88) to hold its place in the top division.

External links
List of VFA/VFL premiers

References

Victorian Football League seasons
VFL